The 2014 Eketahuna earthquake struck at 3:52 pm on 20 January, centred 15 km east of Eketahuna in the south-east of New Zealand's North Island. It had a maximum perceived intensity of VII (Very strong) on the Mercalli intensity scale. Originally reported as magnitude 6.6 on the Richter Scale, the earthquake was later downgraded to a magnitude of 6.2. A total of 1112 aftershocks were recorded, ranging between magnitudes 2.0 and 4.9 on the Richter Scale.

Tectonic setting
New Zealand lies along the boundary between the Indo-Australian Plate and Pacific Plates. In the South Island most of the relative displacement between these plates is taken up along a single dextral (right lateral) strike-slip fault with a major reverse component, the Alpine Fault. In the North Island the displacement is mainly taken up along the Hikurangi Subduction Zone, although the remaining dextral strike-slip component of the relative plate motion is accommodated by the North Island Fault System (NIFS).

The focal mechanism of the earthquake, its depth and the distribution of aftershocks show that it was a result of oblique normal faulting within the upper part of the subducting Pacific Plate, with the rupture terminating upwards at the plate interface.

Damage
It was felt strongly down the country, from Auckland in the north to Dunedin in the south, and more than 9,000 reports were submitted by the public to GeoNet, the geological hazards monitoring network. The New Zealand Herald newspaper reported damage to walls and chimneys and road closures in the lower North Island.

The Earthquake Commission, (EQC) received 5,013 claims, 1,514 of them from Palmerston North. Minor to moderate damage was also reported in Eketahuna, Wellington, Masterton, Carterton, Kapiti Coast, Pahiatua, Levin and Otaki. Three 1920s-style buildings in Masterton were evacuated  after cracks appeared. One building needed to be demolished. According to The New Zealand Herald, two people were injured as a result of falls.

Hokowhitu Lagoon in Palmerston North is thought to have suffered water-bed damage leading to water leaking. Currently no fix is in place to solve this.

See also
List of earthquakes in 2014
List of earthquakes in New Zealand

References

External links
Computer Simulations of Earthquake Waves – GNS Science

Eketahuna earthquake
2014 earthquakes
Earthquakes in New Zealand
Tararua District
Eketāhuna
2014 disasters in New Zealand